Jerry Tondelua Mbuilua (born 27 February 1975) is a Congolese former footballer who played as a striker. He played club football for Sodigraf, Cercle Brugge, Oostende and Al Wahda and international football for the DR Congo national football team, representing his country at the 1998 African Cup of Nations.

Notes

References

1975 births
Living people
Democratic Republic of the Congo footballers
Democratic Republic of the Congo international footballers
Footballers from Kinshasa
Association football forwards
AC Sodigraf players
Cercle Brugge K.S.V. players
K.V. Oostende players
Challenger Pro League players
1998 African Cup of Nations players
Democratic Republic of the Congo expatriate footballers
Expatriate footballers in Belgium
Democratic Republic of the Congo expatriate sportspeople in Belgium
Expatriate footballers in the United Arab Emirates
Democratic Republic of the Congo expatriate sportspeople in the United Arab Emirates
21st-century Democratic Republic of the Congo people